Past Away is the first full-length Studio CD released by Vietnam in 2004 on Scared Records. The album contains 13 original songs that were written by the first incarnation of the band in 1980–81. Unfortunately, the band never released recordings of the songs during that time, but they were resurrected and recorded in 2000 by a newer version of the band.

The title derives from both the fact that it is songs from the Past making a comeback, and that two original members of the band had died in the interim (guitarist Drew Davidson in 1986 and bassist Bruce Sehorne in 1993). The album is dedicated to the memory of both dead members.

Past Away features Stan Satin on lead vocals, saxophone, percussion and piano; original member David Dean on backing vocals, moog synthesizer and percussion; Jennifer Ericson on guitar; David Watkins on drums, Bryan Lilje on bass and guitar, and John Stun on guitar.

Track listing 

 "Was It Long Ago?"
 "(Or Is It That You) Never Lost It?"
 "I B B B"
 "Teeth"
 "12 Or 13"
 "Charge!"
 "Scorchothon"
 "Editor of Hype"
 "Failing"
 "Härte"
 "Bobby Jameson"
 "It Don't Work"
 "Match Your Equal"

External links 
Past Away on Myspace 
Record Label's site
CD Baby website
payplay download site

2004 albums